Intruders or The Intruders may refer to:

Film and television
 The Intruders (1969 film), a spin-off of the Australian TV series Skippy the Bush Kangaroo
 The Intruders (1970 film), an American Western film
 Intruders (2011 film), a supernatural horror film
 Intruders (2013 film), a South Korean film
 Intruders (2015 film), an American horror thriller film
 The Intruders (2015 film), a Canadian thriller film starring Miranda Cosgrove
 Intruders (miniseries), a 1992 American television miniseries
 Intruders (TV series), a 2014 British/American drama series
 "Intruders" (In the Heat of the Night), a television episode
 "Intruders" (Men Behaving Badly), a television episode

Other uses
 Intruders (G.I. Joe), a line of action figures
 The Intruders (band), a 1960s/1970s American soul group
 The Intruders (comics), a group of Marvel Comics supervillains
 The Intruders (novel), a 1994 novel by Stephen Coonts

See also
 Intruder (disambiguation)
 Intrusion (disambiguation)